The white-bellied antbird (Myrmeciza longipes), is a passerine bird which breeds in the tropical New World from Panama to northern Brazil and in Trinidad.  It is also called Swainson's antcatcher (usually in historical sources) after William John Swainson, who first described it scientifically. The genus is monotypic.

Taxonomy
The white-bellied antbird was described by the English naturalist William John Swainson in 1825 and given the binomial name Drymophila longipes. The genus Myrmeciza was erected by the English zoologist George Robert Gray in 1841 with the white-bellied antbird as the type species. The genus formerly included more than 20 species. A molecular phylogenetic study published in 2013 found that Myrmeciza, as then defined, was polyphyletic. In the resulting rearrangement to create monophyletic genera, the species formerly placed in Myrmeciza were moved to 12 other genera leaving the white-bellied antbird as only the only member of the genus.

There are four subspecies:
 M. l. panamensis Ridgway, 1908 – east Panama and north Colombia
 M. l. longipes (Swainson, 1825) – northeast Colombia, north Venezuela and Trinidad
 M. l. boucardi von Berlepsch, 1888 – northcentral Colombia
 M. l. griseipectus von Berlepsch & Hartert, 1902 – southeast Colombia, south Venezuela, the Guianas and northeast Brazil

Description 
This antbird, like others in its family, is a forest bird with a preference for undergrowth in dry or moist deciduous habitats. It is a resident breeder which lays two or three eggs in a nest in a tree, both sexes incubating.

The white-bellied antbird is typically 15 cm long, and weighs 26 g. It has rufous brown upperparts and whitish underparts shading to cinnamon-buff on the flanks and lower belly. There is a long grey supercilium. The pink legs are long and strong, reflecting this bird's terrestrial lifestyle.

The male has a black face, throat and upper breast. The female has a darker crown, grey cheek patches and small dark spots on the wings, and lacks the black markings of the male. The northern race  griseopectus has black spots on the wings and grey central underparts in both sexes.

The white-bellied antbird is an insectivore which feeds on ants and other arthropods at or near the ground; it sometimes follows columns of army ants. It may be located by its bright descending jeer-jeer-jeer-jeer-jeer-jeer-jeer-jeer-jeer-jeer-jeer-jeer song, which ends with a few chew notes.

References

External links

white-bellied antbird
Birds of Panama
Birds of Colombia
Birds of Venezuela
Birds of Trinidad and Tobago
Birds of the Guianas
white-bellied antbird